Periodic elections for the Tasmanian Legislative Council were held on 4 May 2019. The three seats up for election were Montgomery, Nelson and Pembroke. Montgomery and Nelson were previously contested in 2013. Pembroke was won by the Labor Party in a 2017 by-election, following the resignation of the sitting member, Vanessa Goodwin of the Liberal Party.

Montgomery

Montgomery has been held by Leonie Hiscutt of the Liberal Party since the 2013 election.

Nelson

Nelson had been held by independent Jim Wilkinson since 1999. Wilkinson retired at this election.

Pembroke

Pembroke has been held by Jo Siejka of the Labor Party since a 2017 by-election.

Swings are calculated from the 2017 by-election.

References

2019 elections in Australia
Elections in Tasmania
2010s in Tasmania
May 2019 events in Australia
Tasmanian Legislative Council